Haicheng is a town under the administration of Haifeng County, Guangdong, China. , it had 13 residential communities and 9 villages under its administration.

References 

Township-level divisions of Guangdong
Haifeng County